Roger Rosiers (26 November 1946) is a former professional road racing cyclist from Vremde, Belgium.

Major achievements 

1965
1st, Schaal Sels-Merksem
1967
1st, Brabantse Pijl
1968
1st, GP Flandria
1969
1st, Nokere Koerse
1st, Stage 2b, Tour of Belgium
1970
1st, Stage 17, Vuelta a España
1971
1st, Paris–Roubaix
1972
1st, Overall, Tour de Luxembourg
1st, Stage 1
1973
1st, Grand Prix d'Isbergues
1977
1st, Overall, Three Days of De Panne

External links
Profile by memoire-du-cyclisme.net 

Living people
Belgian male cyclists
Belgian Vuelta a España stage winners
1946 births
Cyclists from Antwerp Province
People from Boechout
20th-century Belgian people